OGE Energy Field at the USA Softball Hall of Fame Stadium is a softball-specific ballpark located inside the USA Softball Hall of Fame Complex in Oklahoma City, Oklahoma, United States. It seats 13,000 and is the site of the annual Women's College World Series.

The complex includes 4 fields:
OGE Energy Field
Integris Field (formerly Field 4)
Field 2
Field 3

The complex is owned by the city and operated under a long-term lease by USA Softball with the exception of the office building, which USA Softball owns and uses for its headquarters.

The USA Softball Hall of Fame Complex originally opened in 1987 as the Don E. Porter ASA Hall of Fame Stadium. It was renamed in 2017 when the Amateur Softball Association rebranded to USA Softball. The stadium underwent extensive renovations from September 2013 to 2015.

Through 2017, it hosted two major college tournaments: the Big 12 Conference championship and the Women's College World Series, as well as the World Cup of Softball, one of the premier international softball events. The Big 12 decided to discontinue their tournament after 2010, however the Women's College World Series continued to be held there. In 2017 the Big 12 Conference decided to resume holding a conference tournament starting in the 2017 season; it was still be held at this location along with the USA Softball International Cup once all major renovations to the facility were completed in 2020. Oklahoma City will host the Women's College World Series through 2035, provided the city makes good on its promise to complete a four-phase renovation.

In late summer and early fall of 2018 a new two-story state of the art press box was built, and a new LED jumbotron video scoreboard was also added. Seating capacity (seating bowl and outfield bleachers) was further expanded in time for the 2020 Women's College World Series, ultimately not held due to the COVID-19 pandemic. The latest expansion brought the main stadium's capacity to 13,000.

In 2007, it was ranked the number eight sporting venue in the state of Oklahoma.

See also 

 The Oklahoma State Firefighters Museum is across the street
 Remington Park is next to the stadium to the west
 National Softball Hall of Fame and Museum

References

External links 
 ASA Softball

Softball venues in Oklahoma
Softball venues in the United States
College softball venues in the United States
Sports venues in Oklahoma City
Multi-purpose stadiums in the United States
Stadium
Sports venues completed in 1987
1987 establishments in Oklahoma